Epamera is a genus of butterflies in the family Lycaenidae first described by Hamilton Herbert Druce in 1891. Most authorities consider Epamera to be a subgenus of Iolaus. The species of Epamera are found in the Afrotropical realm.

External links
 Royal Museum of Central Africa Images

Iolaus (butterfly)
Lycaenidae genera